Jeļena Ostapenko was the defending champion, but lost in the first round to Yanina Wickmayer.

Second-seeded Roberta Vinci won the title, defeating Belinda Bencic in the final, 6–4, 6–3.

Both finalists entered the top 10 of WTA rankings for the first time at the conclusion of the tournament.

Seeds 
The top four seeds received a bye into the second round.

Draw

Finals

Top half

Bottom half

Qualifying

Seeds

Qualifiers

Lucky losers

Draw

First qualifier

Second qualifier

Third qualifier

Fourth qualifier

References 
 Main draw
 Qualifying draw

St. Petersburg Ladies' Trophy
St. Petersburg Ladies' Trophy - Singles